Vrio Corp. (formerly DirecTV Latin America LLC; stylized as Vгio) is an American company that manages the commercial operations of the Latin American branch of DirecTV (mostly known as DirecTV Latin America). It is owned by Grupo Werthein. It produces TV content, and owns several TV channels.

As of 2018, DirecTV Latin America's legal name was changed to Vrio Corp.

History

In 1994, Hughes Electronics Corporation and Venezuelan media company Grupo Cisneros create a joint venture named Galaxy Latin America, a company intended to distribute DirecTV services in 27 Latin American countries, initially with an offer of 144 channels. In that same year, it enters the Chilean market and then it was launched in Mexico.

In 2000, Galaxy Latin America LLC was renamed as DirecTV Latin America LLC.

In 2005, Grupo Cisneros sold its 14% stake on DirecTV Latin America to The DirecTV Group Inc.
While in Mexico and Brazil it merged with rival Sky and disappeared, in South America it absorbed Sky as the latter struggled in the market.

On 19 January 2016, the Secretary of Environment of Bogotá, sanctioned DirecTV's Colombian subsidiary, Directv Colombia Ltda., with a sum of $118 million for placing advertisement without the proper permission from the city. The company violated Decree 959, published in 2000, that regulates where companies can place public publicity.

On 15 September 2017, Reuters reported that AT&T, the owner of DirecTV's U.S. and Latin American divisions, had hired an advisor to consider offering DirecTV Latin America on the public stock market. The principal motive was cited as the need to reduce the debt load AT&T would assume if it took over Time Warner as planned. Since that date, the U.S. Dept. of Justice filed suit to block that acquisition on antitrust grounds, a trial is scheduled to start on 19 March 2018 before Judge Leon of the U.S. District Court for the District of Columbia, and a decision is not expected before June–July. However, even if the deal is blocked, AT&T might dispose of the division as not core to its business. On 19 April 2018, the IPO was cancelled.

On 19 May 2020, the company ceased operations in Venezuela, due to US sanctions against pro-Maduro TV channels Globovisión and PDVSA TV in 2019. These channels require mandatory transmission imposed by the telecommunications commission of Venezuela, CONATEL, while the US sanctions simultaneously block the transmission of these channels.

On 21 July 2021, AT&T Latin America announced that they will sell Vrio to Grupo Werthein, which will include all DirecTV operations in Latin America and SKY Brasil (while keeping the broadband operations in Colombia and their stake at Sky México). The sale was completed on 16 November 2021.

Subsidiaries

Chile 
The Chilean subsidiary of DirecTV has operated in the country since 1994. It bought Sky Chile and absorbed it into its operations. It signed an agreement with GTD Manquehue to offer full telephone, television, and internet services throughout the country.

 During the second quarter of 2011, the company was positioned as the second fastest growing pay TV company in Chile, registering 23.8% of the total market.
 In 2012, the company led the pay TV market with an 18.7% market share.
 Between 2012 and 2015, DirecTV Chile received the "Consumer Loyalty" award NPS.
 Between December 2012 and March 2013, the company was consolidated as the first paid television company that has grown the most in the country.
 Between 2011 and 2016, DirecTV Chile received the National Customer Satisfaction Award ProCalidad as the best pay TV service.

In 2012, it made an agreement with Club Deportivo Universidad Católica to carry the brand name DirecTV on their jerseys. In 2015, it made an agreement with Colo-Colo to also carry the DirecTV logo.

 2012 –  Club Deportivo Universidad Católica
 2014 –  Liga Nacional de Básquetbol de Chile
 2015 –  Club Social y Deportivo Colo-Colo

DGO
DGO (previously known as DirecTV Go) is an over-the-top video streaming service that includes both linear channels and video on demand. The service was launched in 2018 in Argentina, Chile and Colombia. In 2019, the service was expanded to Ecuador, Peru and Uruguay, then Mexico and Brazil in 2020. DirecTV satellite subscribers have free access to the service, but Sky Mexico and Sky Brazil subscribers do not. On 11 October 2022, DirecTV Go was rebranded as DGO.

DSports
DSports is a group of sports channels that are exclusive to DirecTV subscribers, featuring primarily association football, basketball, cycling and combat sports.

 Current rights

 Association football: FIFA World Cup, FIFA Club World Cup, FIFA U-20 World Cup, FIFA U-17 World Cup, LaLiga, Copa del Rey, Supercopa de España, Coupe de France, Copa Sudamericana, LaLiga SmartBank, Serie B, Primera Nacional (only in Argentina), FIFA Women's World Cup.
 Basketball: National Basketball Association, Basketball Champions League Americas, EuroLeague, FIBA EuroBasket, FIBA EuroBasket Women, FIBA Americas Championship, FIBA World Championship, FIBA World Championship for Women
 Combat sports: Professional Fighters League, Karate Combat, WGP Kickboxing, Arano Box.
 Cycling: Giro d'Italia, UAE Tour, Tirreno–Adriatico, Tour de Suisse, Strade Bianche, Milan–San Remo, Milano–Torino, Giro di Lombardia, Classic Brugge–De Panne, E3 Saxo Bank Classic, Tour of the Basque Country, GP Miguel Induráin.
 Motor Sports: NASCAR Cup Series, Formula E

References

External links
 

Satellite television
Former AT&T subsidiaries
Former News Corporation subsidiaries
Former General Motors subsidiaries
Former Liberty Media subsidiaries
DirecTV
Companies based in Fort Lauderdale, Florida
1996 establishments in Florida
2021 mergers and acquisitions